The women's 200 metre breaststroke event, included in the swimming competition at the 1976 Summer Olympics, took place on July 21, at the Olympic Pool in Montreal, Canada. In this event, swimmers covered four lengths of the 50-metre (160 ft) Olympic-sized pool employing the breaststroke. It was the twelfth appearance of the event, which first appeared at the 1924 Summer Olympics in Paris. A total of 39 competitors from 22 nations participated in the event.

Records
Prior to this competition, the existing world and Olympic records were:

The following records were established during the competition:

Results

Heats

Final

Sources

References

Swimming at the 1976 Summer Olympics
1976 in women's swimming
Women's events at the 1976 Summer Olympics